Mayr's honeyeater (Ptiloprora mayri) is a species of bird in the family Meliphagidae.
It is found in Indonesia and Papua New Guinea.
Its natural habitat is subtropical or tropical moist montane forests.

References

Ptiloprora
Birds described in 1930
Taxonomy articles created by Polbot